2017 Cambodian League or 2017 Metfone Cambodian League is the 33rd season of the Cambodian League. Contested by 12 clubs, it operates on a system of promotion and relegation with Cambodian Second League. The league starts from 18 February until 19 November. 
Boeung Ket Angkor are the defending champions.

Teams
 Asia Euro United
 Boeung Ket
 Cambodian Tiger 
 CMAC United
 Electricite du Cambodge (Promoted)
 Kirivong Sok Sen Chey (Promoted)
 Nagaworld
 National Defense Ministry
 National Police Commissary
 Phnom Penh Crown
 Preah Khan Reach Svay Rieng
 Western Phnom Penh

Source:

Personnel and sponsoring

Stadiums and locations

Foreign players

The number of foreign players is restricted to five per team. A team can use four foreign players on the field in each game, including at least one player from the AFC country.

League table

Result table

Champions play-off

Quarter final

Semi final

Final

Source:

Season Statistics

Top scorers

Top assists

Hat-tricks

4 players scored 4 goals

Clean sheets

Awards

See also
 2017 Cambodian Second League
 2017 Hun Sen Cup

References

C-League seasons
1
Cambodia